Beed district (Marathi pronunciation: [biːɖ]) is an administrative district in the state of Maharashtra in India. The district headquarters are located at Beed. The district occupies an area of 10,693 km² and has a population of 2,585,049 of which 17.91% were urban (as of 2011).

Officer

Members of Parliament

Pritam Munde (BJP)

Guardian Minister

list of Guardian Minister

District Magistrate/Collector

list of District Magistrate / Collector

History
Beed district has a long history of many rulers and kingdoms. In the ancient era, this city was called as Champavati nagari. The city still proudly shows some old monuments showing the signs of past glory in the form of many city entry doors (called Ves in local language) and city protection walls. Until the 19th century, this part of Marathwada was under the Nizam monarchy, but was later included into the Indian Republic after a fierce struggle between Indian freedom fighters and Nizam soldiers. The name of Bhir is given by Mohammad Tughlaq.

Economy
Agriculture is the main business in Beed, and it is largely dependent on monsoon rain. Beed also is a district which provides a large number sugarcane cutters. A large area of Beed is Rocky and hilly especially the Georai, Ashti, Ambajogai , Kaij and Patoda Taluka, these are the places where custard apple is cultivated.

Divisions
This district is divided into eleven talukas (or tehsils). These are:

 Beed
 Ashti
 Gevrai
 Ambajogai
 Kaij
 Parali (Vaijnath)
 Majalgaon
 Patoda
 Shirur Kasar
 Wadwani
 Dharur

Demographics
According to the 2011 census Beed district has a population of 2,585,049, roughly equal to the nation of Kuwait or the US state of Nevada. This gives it a ranking of 160th in India (out of a total of 640). Its population growth rate over the decade 2001-2011 was 19.65%. Beed has a sex ratio of 912 females for every 1000 males. 19.90% of the population lived in urban areas. Scheduled Castes and Scheduled Tribes make up 13.59% and 1.27% of the population respectively.

At the time of the 2011 Census of India, 83.38% of the population in the district spoke Marathi, 8.62% Urdu, 3.93% Hindi and 2.37% Lambadi as their first language.

See also

Tourism in Marathwada

References

External links

 Beed district official website
 The Unofficial Website of Beed.

 
Districts of Maharashtra
Aurangabad division
Marathwada